Henry Pomeroy, 2nd Viscount Harberton (8 December 1749 – 29 November 1829) was an Anglo-Irish politician.

He was the son of Arthur Pomeroy, 1st Viscount Harberton, and his wife Mary Colley, daughter of Henry Colley of Carbury Castle, and  Lady Mary Hamilton. He served in the Irish House of Commons as Member of Parliament for Strabane from 1776 until 1797. He was called to the Irish Bar in  1775. On 9 April 1798, he succeeded to his father's title as Viscount Harberton and assumed his seat in the Irish House of Lords.

He married Mary Grady, and had one son, Henry, who died young. On his death, his title passed to his brother Arthur.

References
 https://web.archive.org/web/20090601105535/http://www.leighrayment.com/commons/irelandcommons.htm
 

1749 births
1829 deaths
18th-century Anglo-Irish people
Irish MPs 1776–1783
Irish MPs 1783–1790
Irish MPs 1790–1797
Viscounts in the Peerage of Ireland
Members of the Parliament of Ireland (pre-1801) for County Tyrone constituencies